Son Hyun-jong (Hangul: 손현종; born  in Seoul) is a South Korean male volleyball player. On club level he plays for the Uijeongbu KB Stars.

Career
While attending Moonil High School in 2010, Son was selected for the South Korean junior national team to compete at the 2010 Asian Youth (U18) Championship and the 2010 Asian Junior (U20) Championship.

As a sophomore at Inha University in 2012, Son was selected for the South Korean collegiate national team to compete at the 2012 AVC Cup, where the team finished in fifth place.

In the 2013 V-League Draft, Son was selected tenth overall by the  Gumi LIG Greaters.

External links
 profile at FIVB.org

1992 births
Living people
South Korean men's volleyball players
21st-century South Korean people